Hemicycla pouchet is a species of land snail in the family Helicidae. 

It is endemic to the Canary Islands.

References

 Bank, R. A.; Neubert, E. (2017). Checklist of the land and freshwater Gastropoda of Europe. Last update: July 16th, 2017.
 báñez, M. & Alonso, M.R. (2007). A tale of two snails: "Le Pouchet" from Adanson (Mollusca, Gastropoda, Helicoidea, Helicidae). Zoosystema, 29 (3): 575-582

External links

Hemicycla
Molluscs of the Canary Islands
Endemic fauna of the Canary Islands
Gastropods described in 1821
Taxonomy articles created by Polbot